The Neujahrsmarathon Zürich (New Year's Marathon Zurich) is a marathon race founded in 2005 that is held annually on January 1. 

The start takes place at midnight, exactly at the beginning of the New Year. The start and finish are located in Schlieren near Zurich in Switzerland. The track consists of four laps along the river Limmat. Besides the marathon, there are also a half marathon (two laps), a quarter marathon (one 11K lap) as well as a marathon relay. The start of the marathon and the finish area of all races are located inside a sports hall. The participants run through the sports hall after each lap. The race is subject to a time limit of 5 hours, which may be extended in case of bad conditions (snow, ice).

Since 2014 there is also a kids marathon on a 750 meters track, which starts at 10 p.m. on 31 December. This race is free of charge for all participants.

International Membership
All courses of the Neujahrsmarathon Zürich are officially measured according to the rules of IAAF (International Association of Athletics Federations). It is one of only seven Swiss road races sanctioned by the AIMS (Association of International Marathons and Distance Races), so the times are accepted officially by IAAF. The other Swiss AIMS events are the Zürich Marathon, the Zermatt marathon, the Swiss Alpine Marathon, the Jungfrau Marathon, the Swiss City Marathon and the Lausanne Marathon. Thanks to its starting time at the very first second of the year, the Neujahrsmarathon Zurich is the first AIMS running event of the year, and hence the performances of the winners automatically qualify as first official world record times of the year. This possibility to run an official record time of the year for the home country attracts runners from about 50 different countries from all continents.

Organizer
The Neujahrsmarathon Zürich is organized by the Verein Neujahrsmarathon Zürich, a non-profit association founded in 2004. In the association's standing rules the intended purpose is described as: The association  aims to foster and promote the sport of running. In particular, the association organizes each New Year's Eve the Neujahrsmarathon Zürich. The association does not pursue commercial purposes and does not seek profit.

The latter is reflected directly in the entry fee of the Neujahrsmarathon Zürich. Despite its status as recognized by IAAF, the Neujahrsmarathon Zürich is one of the least expensive marathons in Switzerland.

Winners

Marathon

Half marathon
(2013: 18.052 kilometer run)

10 kilometer run
2013: 12.016 kilometer run
2010 to 2012: quarter marathon (10.549 km)
2006: 12.234 kilometer run

Other distances

Participation

All distances

Marathon

Half marathon

10 kilometer run 
(2013: 12.016 kilometer run)

(2010-2012, 2015-2020: quarter marathon (10.549 km))

(2006: 12.234 kilometer run)

5.980 kilometer run

4.2195 kilometer run

Fastest times

Marathon

Half marathon

10 kilometer run

See also
 List of marathon races in Europe

External links

 Official website in English
 Report and results 2013 on the AIMS web site

Marathons in Switzerland
Half marathons
New Year celebrations
Sport in Zürich
Recurring sporting events established in 2005
2005 establishments in Switzerland
Annual events in Switzerland
Winter events in Switzerland